Peterborough School is a Grade II listed former school at Clancarty Road, Fulham, London SW6.

It was built in 1903–04, and the architect was T. J. Bailey, for the London Board School. London Borough of Hammersmith and Fulham education department closed the school in 2007. Half of it was leased to Queensmill School, the other half to the Lycée Français Charles de Gaulle for its primary school, École Marie d'Orliac.

Janet Street-Porter, actress Gaynor Hodgson and boxer George Groves were pupils of Peterborough Primary School.

References

1904 establishments in England
Commercial buildings completed in 1904
Defunct schools in the London Borough of Hammersmith and Fulham
Grade II listed buildings in the London Borough of Hammersmith and Fulham
2007 disestablishments in England